Company Bay is a semi-residential suburb of Dunedin, New Zealand, located on the Otago Peninsula between Macandrew Bay and Broad Bay.
Access to surrounding suburbs and the centre of the city is via Portobello Road, which skirts the edge of Otago Harbour. A smaller, winding road ascends from the bay, linking with the peninsula's ridge road (Highcliff Road) close to Larnach Castle at Pukehiki.

Geography 
The suburb of Company Bay extends north-east from Macandrew Bay, an indentation along the Otago Harbour. The suburb encompasses the Bay and surrounding areas - from mission cove, extending into the hills and around to grassy point. Company Bay is a 20-minute drive from Dunedin city centre.

Demographics

It had a population of 375 at the 2018 New Zealand census, an increase of 45 people (13.6%) since the 2013 census, and an increase of 105 people (38.9%) since the 2006 census. There were 141 households. There were 198 males and 180 females, giving a sex ratio of 1.1 males per female, with 78 people (20.8%) aged under 15 years, 39 (10.4%) aged 15 to 29, 204 (54.4%) aged 30 to 64, and 57 (15.2%) aged 65 or older.

Ethnicities were 92.8% European/Pākehā, 5.6% Māori, 1.6% Pacific peoples, 4.8% Asian, and 2.4% other ethnicities (totals add to more than 100% since people could identify with multiple ethnicities).

Although some people objected to giving their religion, 54.4% had no religion, 37.6% were Christian and 0.8% had other religions.

Of those at least 15 years old, 108 (36.4%) people had a bachelor or higher degree, and 27 (9.1%) people had no formal qualifications. The employment status of those at least 15 was that 156 (52.5%) people were employed full-time, 60 (20.2%) were part-time, and 6 (2.0%) were unemployed.

References

Suburbs of Dunedin